Psychosis is a mental disorder caused by a person becoming disconnected from reality. Symptoms may include delusions and hallucinations, among other features. Additional symptoms are incoherent speech and behavior that is inappropriate for a given situation. There may also be sleep problems, social withdrawal, lack of motivation, and difficulties carrying out daily activities. Psychosis can have serious adverse outcomes.

As with many psychiatric phenomena, psychosis has several different causes. These include mental illness, such as schizophrenia or schizoaffective disorder, bipolar disorder, sensory deprivation and in rare cases, major depression (psychotic depression). Other causes include: trauma, sleep deprivation, some medical conditions, certain medications, and drugs such as cannabis, hallucinogens, and stimulants. One type, known as postpartum psychosis, can occur after giving birth. The neurotransmitter dopamine is believed to play an important role. Acute psychosis is considered primary if it results from a psychiatric condition and secondary if it is caused by a medical condition or drugs. The diagnosis of a mental health condition requires excluding other potential causes. Testing may be done to check for central nervous system diseases, toxins, or other health problems as a cause.

Treatment may include antipsychotic medication, psychotherapy, and social support. Early treatment appears to improve outcomes. Medications appear to have a moderate effect. Outcomes depend on the underlying cause. In the United States about 3% of people develop psychosis at some point in their lives. The condition has been described since at least the 4th century BC by Hippocrates and possibly as early as 1500 BC in the Egyptian Ebers Papyrus.

Signs and symptoms

Hallucinations
A hallucination is defined as sensory perception in the absence of external stimuli. Hallucinations are different from illusions and perceptual distortions, which are the misperception of external stimuli. Hallucinations may occur in any of the senses and take on almost any form. They may consist of simple sensations (such as lights, colors, sounds, tastes, or smells) or more detailed experiences (such as seeing and interacting with animals and people, hearing voices, and having complex tactile sensations). Hallucinations are generally characterized as being vivid and uncontrollable. Auditory hallucinations, particularly experiences of hearing voices, are the most common and often prominent feature of psychosis.

Psychoactive substances predominantly induce visual hallucinations. These are usually preceded by unformed visual sensations – alterations of color, size, shape and movement. The images are usually abstract, such as lines, circles and stars. Later on, the person experiences vivid and colorful images. Auditory hallucinations that are unformed and indistinct noises are heard in substance-induced psychoses. Tactile hallucinations in the form of insects crawling up the skin are experienced during cocaine and amphetamine intoxication. Reflex hallucinations are experienced under the influence of psychedelic drugs, wherein the patient perceives colorful visual hallucination in response to loud noises. After repeated ingestion of drugs, some people may experience a phenomenon called “flashbacks,” which are spontaneous recurrences of illusions and visual hallucinations during the drug-free state, similar to that experienced during the active stage of drug administration. This phenomenon can occur months after the last intake of drug.

Up to 15% of the general population may experience auditory hallucinations (though not all are due to psychosis). The prevalence of auditory hallucinations in patients with schizophrenia is generally put around 70%, but may go as high as 98%. Reported prevalence in bipolar disorder ranges between 11% and 68%. During the early 20th century, auditory hallucinations were second to visual hallucinations in frequency, but they are now the most common manifestation of schizophrenia, although rates vary between cultures and regions. Auditory hallucinations are most commonly intelligible voices. When voices are present, the average number has been estimated at three. Content, like frequency, differs significantly, especially across cultures and demographics. People who experience auditory hallucinations can frequently identify the loudness, location of origin, and may settle on identities for voices. Western cultures are associated with auditory experiences concerning religious content, frequently related to sin. Hallucinations may command a person to do something potentially dangerous when combined with delusions.

So-called "minor hallucinations", such as extracampine hallucinations, or false perceptions of people or movement occurring outside of one's visual field, frequently occur in neurocognitive disorders, such as Parkinson's disease.

Visual hallucinations occur in roughly a third of people with schizophrenia, although rates as high as 55% are reported. The prevalence in bipolar disorder is around 15%. Content commonly involves animate objects, although perceptual abnormalities such as changes in lighting, shading, streaks, or lines may be seen. Visual abnormalities may conflict with proprioceptive information, and visions may include experiences such as the ground tilting. Lilliputian hallucinations are less common in schizophrenia, and are more common in various types of encephalopathy, such as peduncular hallucinosis.

A visceral hallucination, also called a cenesthetic hallucination, is characterized by visceral sensations in the absence of stimuli. Cenesthetic hallucinations may include sensations of burning, or re-arrangement of internal organs.

Delusions
Psychosis may involve delusional beliefs. A delusion is a fixed, false idiosyncratic belief, which does not change even when presented with incontrovertible evidence to the contrary. Delusions are context- and culture-dependent: a belief which inhibits critical functioning and is widely considered delusional in one population may be common (and even adaptive) in another, or in the same population at a later time. Since normative views may contradict available evidence, a belief need not contravene cultural standards in order to be considered delusional.

A delusion is a belief that is clearly false and that indicates an abnormality in the affected person’s content of thought. The false belief is not accounted for by the person’s cultural or religious background or his or her level of intelligence. The key feature of a delusion is the degree to which the person is convinced that the belief is true. A person with a delusion will hold firmly to the belief regardless of evidence to the contrary. Delusions can be difficult to distinguish from overvalued ideas, which are unreasonable ideas that a person holds, but the affected person has at least some level of doubt as to its truthfulness. A person with a delusion is absolutely convinced that the delusion is real. Delusions are a symptom of either a medical, neurological, or mental disorder. Delusions may be present in any of the following mental disorders: (1) Psychotic disorders, or disorders in which the affected person has a diminished or distorted sense of reality and cannot distinguish the real from the unreal, including schizophrenia, schizoaffective disorder, delusional disorder, schizophreniform disorder, shared psychotic disorder, brief psychotic disorder, and substance-induced psychotic disorder, (2) Bipolar disorder, (3) Major depressive disorder with psychotic features (4) Delirium, and (5) Dementia.

Prevalence in schizophrenia is generally considered at least 90%, and around 50% in bipolar disorder.

The DSM-5 characterizes certain delusions as "bizarre" if they are clearly implausible, or are incompatible with the surrounding cultural context. The concept of bizarre delusions has many criticisms, the most prominent being judging its presence is not highly reliable even among trained individuals.

A delusion may involve diverse thematic content. The most common type is a persecutory delusion, in which a person believes that an entity seeks to harm them. Others include delusions of reference (the belief that some element of one's experience represents a deliberate and specific act by or message from some other entity), delusions of grandeur (the belief that one possesses special power or influence beyond one's actual limits), thought broadcasting (the belief that one's thoughts are audible) and thought insertion (the belief that one's thoughts are not one's own). A delusion may also involve misidentification of objects, persons, or environs that the afflicted should reasonably be able to recognize; such examples include Cotard's syndrome (the belief that oneself is partly or wholly dead) and clinical lycanthropy (the belief that oneself is or has transformed into an animal).

The subject matter of delusions seems to reflect the current culture in a particular time and location. For example, in the US, during the early 1900s syphilis was a common topic, during the Second World War Germany, during the Cold War communists, and in recent years, technology has been a focus. Some psychologists, such as those who practice the Open Dialogue method, believe that the content of psychosis represents an underlying thought process that may, in part, be responsible for psychosis, though the accepted medical position is that psychosis is due to a brain disorder.

Historically, Karl Jaspers classified psychotic delusions into primary and secondary types. Primary delusions are defined as arising suddenly and not being comprehensible in terms of normal mental processes, whereas secondary delusions are typically understood as being influenced by the person's background or current situation (e.g., ethnicity; also religious, superstitious, or political beliefs).

Disorganization of speech/thought or behavior
Disorganization is split into disorganized speech (or thought), and grossly disorganized motor behavior. Disorganized speech or thought, also called formal thought disorder, is disorganization of thinking that is inferred from speech. Characteristics of disorganized speech include rapidly switching topics, called derailment or loose association; switching to topics that are unrelated, called tangential thinking; incomprehensible speech, called word salad or incoherence. Disorganized motor behavior includes repetitive, odd, or sometimes purposeless movement. Disorganized motor behavior rarely includes catatonia, and although it was a historically prominent symptom, it is rarely seen today. Whether this is due to historically used treatments or the lack thereof is unknown.

Catatonia describes a profoundly agitated state in which the experience of reality is generally considered impaired. There are two primary manifestations of catatonic behavior. The classic presentation is a person who does not move or interact with the world in any way while awake. This type of catatonia presents with waxy flexibility. Waxy flexibility is when someone physically moves part of a catatonic person's body and the person stays in the position even if it is bizarre and otherwise nonfunctional (such as moving a person's arm straight up in the air and the arm staying there).

The other type of catatonia is more of an outward presentation of the profoundly agitated state described above. It involves excessive and purposeless motor behaviour, as well as an extreme mental preoccupation that prevents an intact experience of reality. An example is someone walking very fast in circles to the exclusion of anything else with a level of mental preoccupation (meaning not focused on anything relevant to the situation) that was not typical of the person prior to the symptom onset. In both types of catatonia, there is generally no reaction to anything that happens outside of them. It is important to distinguish catatonic agitation from severe bipolar mania, although someone could have both.

Negative symptoms
Negative symptoms include reduced emotional expression (flat affect), decreased motivation (avolition), and reduced spontaneous speech (poverty of speech, alogia). Individuals with this condition lack interest and spontaneity, and have the inability to feel pleasure (anhedonia).

Psychosis in adolescents 
Psychosis is rare in adolescents.  Young people who have psychosis may have trouble connecting with the world around them and may experience hallucinations and/or delusions. Adolescents with psychosis may also have cognitive deficits that may make it harder for the youth to socialize and work. Potential impairments include the speed of mental processing, ability to focus without getting distracted (limited attention span), and deficits in verbal memory. If an adolescent is experiencing psychosis, they most likely have comorbidity meaning they could have multiple mental illnesses. Because of this, it can be difficult to determine if it is psychosis or autism spectrum disorder, social or generalized anxiety disorder, or obsessive-compulsive disorder.

History

Etymology
The word psychosis was introduced to the psychiatric literature in 1841 by Karl Friedrich Canstatt in his work Handbuch der Medizinischen Klinik. He used it as a shorthand for 'psychic neurosis'. At that time neurosis meant any disease of the nervous system, and Canstatt was thus referring to what was considered a psychological manifestation of brain disease. Ernst von Feuchtersleben is also widely credited as introducing the term in 1845, as an alternative to insanity and mania.

The term stems from Modern Latin psychosis, "a giving soul or life to, animating, quickening" and that from Ancient Greek ψυχή, "soul" and the suffix -ωσις (-), in this case  "abnormal condition".

In its adjective form "psychotic", references to psychosis can be found in both clinical and non-clinical discussions. However, in a non-clinical context, "psychotic" is a nonspecific colloquialism used to mean "insane".

Classification
The word was also used to distinguish a condition considered a disorder of the mind, as opposed to neurosis, which was considered a disorder of the nervous system. The psychoses thus became the modern equivalent of the old notion of madness, and hence there was much debate on whether there was only one (unitary) or many forms of the new disease. One type of broad usage would later be narrowed down by Koch in 1891 to the 'psychopathic inferiorities'—later renamed abnormal personalities by Schneider.

The division of the major psychoses into manic depressive illness (now called bipolar disorder) and dementia praecox (now called schizophrenia) was made by Emil Kraepelin, who attempted to create a synthesis of the various mental disorders identified by 19th-century psychiatrists, by grouping diseases together based on classification of common symptoms. Kraepelin used the term 'manic depressive insanity' to describe the whole spectrum of mood disorders, in a far wider sense than it is usually used today.

In Kraepelin's classification this would include 'unipolar' clinical depression, as well as bipolar disorder and other mood disorders such as cyclothymia. These are characterised by problems with mood control and the psychotic episodes appear associated with disturbances in mood, and patients often have periods of normal functioning between psychotic episodes even without medication. Schizophrenia is characterized by psychotic episodes that appear unrelated to disturbances in mood, and most non-medicated patients show signs of disturbance between psychotic episodes.

Treatment
Early civilizations considered madness a supernaturally inflicted phenomenon. Archaeologists have unearthed skulls with clearly visible drillings, some datable back to 5000 BC suggesting that trepanning was a common treatment for psychosis in ancient times.  Written record of supernatural causes and resultant treatments can be traced back to the New Testament. Mark 5:8–13 describes a man displaying what would today be described as psychotic symptoms. Christ cured this "demonic madness" by casting out the demons and hurling them into a herd of swine. Exorcism is still utilized in some religious circles as a treatment for psychosis presumed to be demonic possession. A research study of out-patients in psychiatric clinics found that 30 percent of religious patients attributed the cause of their psychotic symptoms to evil spirits. Many of these patients underwent exorcistic healing rituals that, though largely regarded as positive experiences by the patients, had no effect on symptomology. Results did, however, show a significant worsening of psychotic symptoms associated with exclusion of medical treatment for coercive forms of exorcism.

The medical teachings of the fourth-century philosopher and physician Hippocrates of Cos proposed a natural, rather than supernatural, cause of human illness. In Hippocrates' work, the Hippocratic corpus, a holistic explanation for health and disease was developed to include madness and other "diseases of the mind".  Hippocrates writes:

Hippocrates espoused a theory of humoralism wherein disease is resultant of a shifting balance in bodily fluids including blood, phlegm, black bile, and yellow bile. According to humoralism, each fluid or "humour" has temperamental or behavioral correlates. In the case of psychosis, symptoms are thought to be caused by an excess of both blood and yellow bile. Thus, the proposed surgical intervention for psychotic or manic behavior was bloodletting.

18th-century physician, educator, and widely considered "founder of American psychiatry", Benjamin Rush, also prescribed bloodletting as a first-line treatment for psychosis. Although not a proponent of humoralism, Rush believed that active purging and bloodletting were efficacious corrections for disruptions in the circulatory system, a complication he believed was the primary cause of "insanity". Although Rush's treatment modalities are now considered antiquated and brutish, his contributions to psychiatry, namely the biological underpinnings of psychiatric phenomenon including psychosis, have been invaluable to the field. In honor of such contributions, Benjamin Rush's image is in the official seal of the American Psychiatric Association.

Early 20th-century treatments for severe and persisting psychosis were characterized by an emphasis on shocking the nervous system. Such therapies include insulin shock therapy, cardiazol shock therapy, and electroconvulsive therapy. Despite considerable risk, shock therapy was considered highly efficacious in the treatment of psychosis including schizophrenia. The acceptance of high-risk treatments led to more invasive medical interventions including psychosurgery.

In 1888, Swiss psychiatrist Gottlieb Burckhardt performed the first medically sanctioned psychosurgery in which the cerebral cortex was excised. Although some patients showed improvement of symptoms and became more subdued, one patient died and several developed aphasia or seizure disorders. Burckhardt would go on to publish his clinical outcomes in a scholarly paper. This procedure was met with criticism from the medical community and his academic and surgical endeavors were largely ignored. In the late 1930s, Egas Moniz conceived the leucotomy (AKA prefrontal lobotomy) in which the fibers connecting the frontal lobes to the rest of the brain were severed. Moniz's primary inspiration stemmed from a demonstration by neuroscientists John Fulton and Carlyle's 1935 experiment in which two chimpanzees were given leucotomies and pre- and post-surgical behavior was compared. Prior to the leucotomy, the chimps engaged in typical behavior including throwing feces and fighting. After the procedure, both chimps were pacified and less violent. During the Q&A, Moniz asked if such a procedure could be extended to human subjects, a question that Fulton admitted was quite startling. Moniz would go on to extend the controversial practice to humans with various psychotic disorders, an endeavor for which he received a Nobel Prize in 1949. Between the late 1930s and early 1970s, the leucotomy was a widely accepted practice, often performed in non-sterile environments such as small outpatient clinics and patient homes. Psychosurgery remained standard practice until the discovery of antipsychotic pharmacology in the 1950s.

The first clinical trial of antipsychotics (also commonly known as neuroleptics) for the treatment of psychosis took place in 1952. Chlorpromazine (brand name: Thorazine) passed clinical trials and became the first antipsychotic medication approved for the treatment of both acute and chronic psychosis. Although the mechanism of action was not discovered until 1963, the administration of chlorpromazine marked the advent of the dopamine antagonist, or first generation antipsychotic. While clinical trials showed a high response rate for both acute psychosis and disorders with psychotic features, the side effects were particularly harsh, which included high rates of often irreversible Parkinsonian symptoms such as tardive dyskinesia. With the advent of atypical antipsychotics (also known as second generation antipsychotics) came a dopamine antagonist with a comparable response rate but a far different, though still extensive, side-effect profile that included a lower risk of Parkinsonian symptoms but a higher risk of cardiovascular disease.  Atypical antipsychotics remain the first-line treatment for psychosis associated with various psychiatric and neurological disorders including schizophrenia, bipolar disorder, major depressive disorder, anxiety disorders, dementia, and some autism spectrum disorders.

Dopamine is now one of the primary neurotransmitters implicated in psychotic symptomology. Blocking dopamine receptors (namely, the dopamine D2 receptors) and decreasing dopaminergic activity continues to be an effective but highly unrefined effect of antipsychotics, which are commonly used to treat psychosis. Recent pharmacological research suggests that the decrease in dopaminergic activity does not eradicate psychotic delusions or hallucinations, but rather attenuates the reward mechanisms involved in the development of delusional thinking; that is, connecting or finding meaningful relationships between unrelated stimuli or ideas. The author of this research paper acknowledges the importance of future investigation:

Freud's former student Wilhelm Reich explored independent insights into the physical effects of neurotic and traumatic upbringing, and published his holistic psychoanalytic treatment with a schizophrenic. With his incorporation of breathwork and insight with the patient, a young woman, she achieved sufficient self-management skills to end the therapy.

Lacan extended Freud's ideas to create a psychoanalytic model of psychosis based upon the concept of "foreclosure", the rejection of the symbolic concept of the father.

Society
Psychiatrist David Healy has criticised pharmaceutical companies for promoting simplified biological theories of mental illness that seem to imply the primacy of pharmaceutical treatments while ignoring social and developmental factors that are known important influences in the etiology of psychosis.

Disability
The classification of psychosis as a social disability is a common occurrence.

Psychosis is considered to be among the top 10 causes of social disability among adult men and women in developed countries. And the traditional, negative narrative around disability has been shown to strongly and adversely influence the pathways through employment and education for people experiencing psychosis.

Social disability by way of social disconnection is a significant public health concern and is associated with a broad range of negative outcomes, including premature mortality. Social disconnection refers to the ongoing absence of family or social relationships with marginal participation in social activities.

N. Myers (2019), N. A. L. Myers (2012) and Brown (2011) found that reduced participation in social networks, not only negatively effects the individual on a physical and mental level, it has been shown that failure to be included in social networks influences the individual's ability to participate in the wider community through employment and education opportunities.

N. Myers (2019) discuss how equal opportunity to participate in meaningful relationships with friends, family and partners, as well as engaging in social constructs such as employment, can provide significant physical and mental value to people's lives. And how breaking the disability mindset around people experiencing psychosis is imperative for their overall, long-term health and wellbeing as well as the contributions they are able to make to their immediate social connections and the wider community.

Causes 
The symptoms of psychosis may be caused by serious psychiatric disorders such as schizophrenia, a number of medical illnesses, and trauma. Psychosis may also be temporary or transient, and be caused by medications or substance use disorder (substance-induced psychosis).

Normal states
Brief hallucinations are not uncommon in those without any psychiatric disease, including healthy children. Causes or triggers include:
 Falling asleep and waking: hypnagogic and hypnopompic hallucinations
 Bereavement, in which hallucinations of a deceased loved one are common
 Severe sleep deprivation
Extreme stress (see below)

Trauma and stress 
Traumatic life events have been linked with an elevated risk of developing psychotic symptoms. Childhood trauma has specifically been shown to be a predictor of adolescent and adult psychosis. Individuals with psychotic symptoms are three times more likely to have experienced childhood trauma (e.g., physical or sexual abuse, physical or emotional neglect) than those in the general population. Increased individual vulnerability toward psychosis may interact with traumatic experiences promoting an onset of future psychotic symptoms, particularly during sensitive developmental periods. Importantly, the relationship between traumatic life events and psychotic symptoms appears to be dose-dependent in which multiple traumatic life events accumulate, compounding symptom expression and severity. However, acute, stressful events can also trigger brief psychotic episodes. Trauma prevention and early intervention may be an important target for decreasing the incidence of psychotic disorders and ameliorating its effects.A healthy person could become psychotic if he is placed in an empty room with no light and sound after 15 minutes, a phenomenon known as sensory deprivation.

Neuroticism, a personality trait associated with vulnerability to stressors, is an independent predictor of the development of psychosis.

Psychiatric disorders
From a diagnostic standpoint, organic disorders were believed to be caused by physical illness affecting the brain (that is, psychiatric disorders secondary to other conditions) while functional disorders were considered disorders of the functioning of the mind in the absence of physical disorders (that is, primary psychological or psychiatric disorders). Subtle physical abnormalities have been found in illnesses traditionally considered functional, such as schizophrenia. The DSM-IV-TR avoids the functional/organic distinction, and instead lists traditional psychotic illnesses, psychosis due to general medical conditions, and substance-induced psychosis.

Primary psychiatric causes of psychosis include the following:
 schizophrenia
 mood disorders, including major depression, and severe depression or mania in bipolar disorder (manic depression). People experiencing a psychotic episode in the context of depression may experience persecutory or self-blaming delusions or hallucinations, while people experiencing a psychotic episode in the context of mania may form grandiose delusions.
 schizoaffective disorder, involving symptoms of both schizophrenia and one or more mood disorders
 delusional disorder (persistent delusional disorder)

Psychotic symptoms may also be seen in:
 Schizotypal personality disorder 
 Certain personality disorders in times of stress (including paranoid personality disorder, schizoid personality disorder, and borderline personality disorder)
 Major depressive disorder in its severe form, although it is possible and more likely to have severe depression without psychosis
 Bipolar disorder in the manic and mixed episodes of bipolar I disorder and depressive episodes of both bipolar I and bipolar II; however, it is possible to experience such states without psychotic symptoms.
 Post-traumatic stress disorder
 Shared delusional disorder
 Sometimes in obsessive–compulsive disorder (OCD)
 Dissociative disorders, due to many overlapping symptoms. It is also important to note that those with dissociative disorders may be more vulnerable to psychotic symptoms due to the disconnect from reality that is already experienced. Careful differential diagnosis includes especially dissociative identity disorder.

Subtypes
Subtypes of psychosis include:

 Postpartum psychosis, occurring shortly after giving birth, primarily associated with maternal bipolar disorder
 Monothematic delusions
 Myxedematous psychosis
 Stimulant psychosis
 Tardive psychosis
 Shared psychosis (folie à deux)

Cycloid psychosis
Cycloid psychosis is typically an acute, self-limiting form of psychosis with psychotic and mood symptoms that progress from normal to full-blown, usually between a few hours to days, and not related to drug intake or brain injury. While proposed as a distinct entity, clinically separate from schizophrenia and affective disorders, cycloid psychosis is not formally acknowledged by current ICD or DSM criteria. Its unclear place in psychiatric nosology has likely contributed to the limited scientific investigation and literature on the topic.

Postpartum psychosis 
Postpartum psychosis is a rare yet serious and debilitating form of psychosis. Symptoms range from fluctuating moods and insomnia to mood-incongruent delusions related to the individual or the infant. Women experiencing postpartum psychosis are at increased risk for suicide or infanticide. Many women who experience first-time psychosis from postpartum often have bipolar disorder, meaning they could experience an increase of psychotic episodes even after postpartum.

Medical conditions
A very large number of medical conditions can cause psychosis, sometimes called secondary psychosis. Examples include:
 disorders causing delirium (toxic psychosis), in which consciousness is disturbed
 neurodevelopmental disorders and chromosomal abnormalities, including velocardiofacial syndrome
 neurodegenerative disorders, such as Alzheimer's disease, dementia with Lewy bodies, and Parkinson's disease
 focal neurological disease, such as stroke, brain tumors, multiple sclerosis, and some forms of epilepsy
 malignancy (typically via masses in the brain, paraneoplastic syndromes)
 infectious and postinfectious syndromes, including infections causing delirium, viral encephalitis, HIV/AIDS, malaria, syphilis
 endocrine disease, such as hypothyroidism, hyperthyroidism, Cushing's syndrome, hypoparathyroidism and hyperparathyroidism; sex hormones also affect psychotic symptoms and sometimes giving birth can provoke psychosis, termed postpartum psychosis
 inborn errors of metabolism, such as Wilson's disease, porphyria, and homocysteinemia. 
 nutritional deficiency, such as vitamin B12 deficiency
 other acquired metabolic disorders, including electrolyte disturbances such as hypocalcemia, hypernatremia, hyponatremia, hypokalemia, hypomagnesemia, hypermagnesemia, hypercalcemia, and hypophosphatemia, but also hypoglycemia, hypoxia, and failure of the liver or kidneys
 autoimmune and related disorders, such as systemic lupus erythematosus (lupus, SLE), sarcoidosis, Hashimoto's encephalopathy, anti-NMDA-receptor encephalitis, and non-celiac gluten sensitivity
 poisoning, by therapeutic drugs (see below), recreational drugs (see below), and a range of plants, fungi, metals, organic compounds, and a few animal toxins
 sleep disorders, such as in narcolepsy (in which REM sleep intrudes into wakefulness)
parasitic diseases, such as neurocysticercosis
huntington disease

Psychoactive drugs

Various psychoactive substances (both legal and illegal) have been implicated in causing, exacerbating, or precipitating psychotic states or disorders in users, with varying levels of evidence. This may be upon intoxication for a more prolonged period after use, or upon withdrawal. Individuals who experience substance-induced psychosis tend to have a greater awareness of their psychosis and tend to have higher levels of suicidal thinking compared to those who have a primary psychotic illness. Drugs commonly alleged to induce psychotic symptoms include alcohol, cannabis, cocaine, amphetamines, cathinones, psychedelic drugs (such as LSD and psilocybin), κ-opioid receptor agonists (such as enadoline and salvinorin A) and NMDA receptor antagonists (such as phencyclidine and ketamine). Caffeine may worsen symptoms in those with schizophrenia and cause psychosis at very high doses in people without the condition. Cannabis and other illicit recreational drugs are often associated with psychosis in adolescents and cannabis use before 15 years old may increase the risk of psychosis in adulthood.

Alcohol

Approximately three percent of people with alcoholism experience psychosis during acute intoxication or withdrawal. Alcohol related psychosis may manifest itself through a kindling mechanism. The mechanism of alcohol-related psychosis is due to the long-term effects of alcohol consumption resulting in distortions to neuronal membranes, gene expression, as well as thiamin deficiency. It is possible that hazardous alcohol use via a kindling mechanism can cause the development of a chronic substance-induced psychotic disorder, i.e. schizophrenia. The effects of an alcohol-related psychosis include an increased risk of depression and suicide as well as causing psychosocial impairments. Delirium tremens, a symptom of chronic alcoholism which can appear in the acute withdrawal phase, shares many symptoms with alcohol-related psychosis suggesting a common mechanism.

Cannabis

According to current studies, cannabis use is associated with increased risk of psychotic disorders, and the more often cannabis is used the more likely a person is to develop a psychotic illness. Furthermore, people with a history of cannabis use develop psychotic symptoms earlier than those who have never used cannabis. Some debate exists regarding the causal relationship between cannabis use and psychosis with some studies suggesting that cannabis use hastens the onset of psychosis primarily in those with pre-existing vulnerability. Indeed, cannabis use plays an important role in the development of psychosis in vulnerable individuals, and cannabis use in adolescence should be discouraged. Some studies indicate that the effects of two active compounds in cannabis, tetrahydrocannabinol (THC) and cannabidiol (CBD), have opposite effects with respect to psychosis. While THC can induce psychotic symptoms in healthy individuals, limited evidence suggests that CBD may have antipsychotic effects.

Methamphetamine

Methamphetamine induces a psychosis in 26–46 percent of heavy users. Some of these people develop a long-lasting psychosis that can persist for longer than six months. Those who have had a short-lived psychosis from methamphetamine can have a relapse of the methamphetamine psychosis years later after a stressful event such as severe insomnia or a period of hazardous alcohol use despite not relapsing back to methamphetamine. Individuals who have a long history of methamphetamine use and who have experienced psychosis in the past from methamphetamine use are highly likely to re-experience methamphetamine psychosis if drug use is recommenced. Methamphetamine-induced psychosis is likely gated by genetic vulnerability, which can produce long-term changes in brain neurochemistry following repetitive use.

Medication
Administration, or sometimes withdrawal, of a large number of medications may provoke psychotic symptoms. Drugs that can induce psychosis experimentally or in a significant proportion of people include stimulants, such as amphetamine and other sympathomimetics, dopamine agonists, ketamine, corticosteroids (often with mood changes in addition), and some anticonvulsants such as vigabatrin.

Pathophysiology

Neuroimaging
The first brain image of an individual with psychosis was completed as far back as 1935 using a technique called pneumoencephalography (a painful and now obsolete procedure where cerebrospinal fluid is drained from around the brain and replaced with air to allow the structure of the brain to show up more clearly on an X-ray picture).

Both first episode psychosis, and high risk status is associated with reductions in grey matter volume (GMV). First episode psychotic and high risk populations are associated with similar but distinct abnormalities in GMV. Reductions in the right middle temporal gyrus, right superior temporal gyrus (STG), right parahippocampus, right hippocampus, right middle frontal gyrus, and left anterior cingulate cortex (ACC) are observed in high risk populations. Reductions in first episode psychosis span a region from the right STG to the right insula, left insula, and cerebellum, and are more severe in the right ACC, right STG, insula and cerebellum.

Another meta analysis reported bilateral reductions in insula, operculum, STG, medial frontal cortex, and ACC, but also reported increased GMV in the right lingual gyrus and left precentral gyrus.  The Kraepelinian dichotomy is made questionable by grey matter abnormalities in bipolar and schizophrenia; schizophrenia is distinguishable from bipolar in that regions of grey matter reduction are generally larger in magnitude, although adjusting for gender differences reduces the difference to the left dorsomedial prefrontal cortex, and right dorsolateral prefrontal cortex.

During attentional tasks, first episode psychosis is associated with hypoactivation in the right middle frontal gyrus, a region generally described as encompassing the dorsolateral prefrontal cortex (dlPFC). In congruence with studies on grey matter volume, hypoactivity in the right insula, and right inferior parietal lobe is also reported. During cognitive tasks, hypoactivities in the right insula, dACC, and the left precuneus, as well as reduced deactivations in the right basal ganglia, right thalamus, right inferior frontal and left precentral gyri are observed. These results are highly consistent and replicable possibly except the abnormalities of the right inferior frontal gyrus. Decreased grey matter volume in conjunction with bilateral hypoactivity is observed in anterior insula, dorsal medial frontal cortex, and dorsal ACC. Decreased grey matter volume and bilateral hyperactivity is reported in posterior insula, ventral medial frontal cortex, and ventral ACC.

Hallucinations
Studies during acute experiences of hallucinations demonstrate increased activity in primary or secondary sensory cortices. As auditory hallucinations are most common in psychosis, most robust evidence exists for increased activity in the left middle temporal gyrus, left superior temporal gyrus, and left inferior frontal gyrus (i.e. Broca's area). Activity in the ventral striatum, hippocampus, and ACC are related to the lucidity of hallucinations, and indicate that activation or involvement of emotional circuitry are key to the impact of abnormal activity in sensory cortices. Together, these findings indicate abnormal processing of internally generated sensory experiences, coupled with abnormal emotional processing, results in hallucinations. One proposed model involves a failure of feedforward networks from sensory cortices to the inferior frontal cortex, which normally cancel out sensory cortex activity during internally generated speech. The resulting disruption in expected and perceived speech is thought to produce lucid hallucinatory experiences.

Delusions
The two-factor model of delusions posits that dysfunction in both belief formation systems and belief evaluation systems are necessary for delusions. Dysfunction in evaluations systems localized to the right lateral prefrontal cortex, regardless of delusion content, is supported by neuroimaging studies and is congruent with its role in conflict monitoring in healthy persons. Abnormal activation and reduced volume is seen in people with delusions, as well as in disorders associated with delusions such as frontotemporal dementia, psychosis and Lewy body dementia. Furthermore, lesions to this region are associated with "jumping to conclusions", damage to this region is associated with post-stroke delusions, and hypometabolism this region associated with caudate strokes presenting with delusions.

The aberrant salience model suggests that delusions are a result of people assigning excessive importance to irrelevant stimuli. In support of this hypothesis, regions normally associated with the salience network demonstrate reduced grey matter in people with delusions, and the neurotransmitter dopamine, which is widely implicated in salience processing, is also widely implicated in psychotic disorders.

Specific regions have been associated with specific types of delusions. The volume of the hippocampus and parahippocampus is related to paranoid delusions in Alzheimer's disease, and has been reported to be abnormal post mortem in one person with delusions. Capgras delusions have been associated with occipito-temporal damage, and may be related to failure to elicit normal emotions or memories in response to faces.

Negative symptoms

Psychosis is associated with ventral striatal (VS) which is the part of the brain that is involved with the desire to naturally satisfy the body's needs. When high reports of negative symptoms were recorded, there were significant irregularities in the left VS. Anhedonia, the inability to feel pleasure, is a commonly reported symptom in psychosis; experiences are present in most people with schizophrenia. Anhedonia arises as a result of the inability to feel motivation and drive towards both the desire to engage in as well as to complete tasks and goals. Previous research has indicated that a deficiency in the neural representation in regards to goals and the motivation to achieve them, has demonstrated that when a reward is not present, a strong reaction is noted in the ventral striatum; reinforcement learning is intact when contingencies about stimulus-reward are implicit, but not when they require explicit neural processing; reward prediction errors are what the actual reward is versus what the reward was predicted to be. In most cases positive prediction errors are considered an abnormal occurrence. A positive prediction error response occurs when there is an increased activation in a brain region, typically the striatum, in response to unexpected rewards. A negative prediction error response occurs when there is a decreased activation in a region when predicted rewards do not occur. Anterior Cingulate Cortex (ACC) response, taken as an indicator of effort allocation, does not increase with reward or reward probability increase, and is associated with negative symptoms; deficits in Dorsolateral Prefrontal Cortex (dlPFC) activity and failure to improve performance on cognitive tasks when offered monetary incentives are present; and dopamine mediated functions are abnormal.

Neurobiology 

Psychosis has been traditionally linked to the overactivity of the neurotransmitter dopamine. In particular to its effect in the mesolimbic pathway. The two major sources of evidence given to support this theory are that dopamine receptor D2 blocking drugs (i.e., antipsychotics) tend to reduce the intensity of psychotic symptoms, and that drugs that accentuate dopamine release, or inhibit its reuptake (such as amphetamines and cocaine) can trigger psychosis in some people (see stimulant psychosis).

NMDA receptor dysfunction has been proposed as a mechanism in psychosis.  This theory is reinforced by the fact that dissociative NMDA receptor antagonists such as ketamine, PCP and dextromethorphan (at large overdoses) induce a psychotic state. The symptoms of dissociative intoxication are also considered to mirror the symptoms of schizophrenia, including negative symptoms.  NMDA receptor antagonism, in addition to producing symptoms reminiscent of psychosis, mimics the neurophysiological aspects, such as reduction in the amplitude of P50, P300, and MMN evoked potentials. Hierarchical Bayesian neurocomputational models of sensory feedback, in agreement with neuroimaging literature, link NMDA receptor hypofunction to delusional or hallucinatory symptoms via proposing a failure of NMDA mediated top down predictions to adequately cancel out enhanced bottom up AMPA mediated predictions errors. Excessive prediction errors in response to stimuli that would normally not produce such a response is thought to root from conferring excessive salience to otherwise mundane events. Dysfunction higher up in the hierarchy, where representation is more abstract, could result in delusions. The common finding of reduced GAD67 expression in psychotic disorders may explain enhanced AMPA mediated signaling, caused by reduced GABAergic inhibition.

The connection between dopamine and psychosis is generally believed to be complex. While dopamine receptor D2 suppresses adenylate cyclase activity, the D1 receptor increases it. If D2-blocking drugs are administered, the blocked dopamine spills over to the D1 receptors. The increased adenylate cyclase activity affects genetic expression in the nerve cell, which takes time. Hence antipsychotic drugs take a week or two to reduce the symptoms of psychosis. Moreover, newer and equally effective antipsychotic drugs actually block slightly less dopamine in the brain than older drugs whilst also blocking 5-HT2A receptors, suggesting the 'dopamine hypothesis' may be oversimplified. Soyka and colleagues found no evidence of dopaminergic dysfunction in people with alcohol-induced psychosis and Zoldan et al. reported moderately successful use of ondansetron, a 5-HT3 receptor antagonist, in the treatment of levodopa psychosis in Parkinson's disease patients.

A review found an association between a first-episode of psychosis and prediabetes.

Prolonged or high dose use of psychostimulants can alter normal functioning, making it similar to the manic phase of bipolar disorder. NMDA antagonists replicate some of the so-called "negative" symptoms like thought disorder in subanesthetic doses (doses insufficient to induce anesthesia), and catatonia in high doses. Psychostimulants, especially in one already prone to psychotic thinking, can cause some "positive" symptoms, such as delusional beliefs, particularly those persecutory in nature.

Culture 
Cross-cultural studies into schizophrenia have found that individual experiences of psychosis and 'hearing voices' vary across cultures. In countries such as the United States where there exists a predominantly biomedical understanding of the body, the mind and in turn, mental health, subjects were found to report their hallucinations as having 'violent content' and self-describing as 'crazy'. This lived experience is at odds with the lived experience of subjects in Accra, Ghana, who describe the voices they hear as having 'spiritual meaning' and are often reported as positive in nature; or subjects in Chennai, India, who describe their hallucinations as kin, family members or close friends, and offering guidance.

These differences are attributed to 'social kindling' or how one's social context shapes how an individual interprets and experiences sensations such as hallucinations. This concept aligns with pre-existing cognitive theory such as reality modelling and is supported by recent research that demonstrates that individuals with psychosis can be taught to attend to their hallucinations differently, which in turn alters the hallucinations themselves. Such research creates pathways for social or community-based treatment, such as reality monitoring, for individuals with schizophrenia and other psychotic disorders, providing alternatives to, or supplementing traditional pharmacologic management.

Cross-cultural studies explore the way in which psychosis varies in different cultures, countries and religions. The cultural differences are based on the individual or shared illness narratives surrounding cultural meanings of illness experience. In countries such as India, Cambodia and Muslim majority countries, they each share alternative epistemologies. These are known as knowledge systems that focus on the connections between mind, body, culture, nature, and society. Cultural perceptions of mental disorders such as psychosis or schizophrenia are believed to be caused by jinn (spirits) in Muslim majority countries. Furthermore, those in Arab-Muslim societies perceive those who act differently than the social norm as "crazy" or as abnormal behaviour. This differs from the lived experience of individuals in India and how they attain their perspectives on mental health issues through a variety of spiritual and healing traditions. In Cambodia, hallucinations are linked with spirit visitation, a term they call "cultural kindling". These examples of differences are attributed to culture and the way it shapes conceptions of mental disorders. These cultural differences can be useful in bridging the gap of cultural understanding and psychiatric signs and symptoms.

Diagnosis
To make a diagnosis of a mental illness in someone with psychosis other potential causes must be excluded. An initial assessment includes a comprehensive history and physical examination by a health care provider. Tests may be done to exclude substance use, medication, toxins, surgical complications, or other medical illnesses. A person with psychosis is referred to as psychotic.

Delirium should be ruled out, which can be distinguished by visual hallucinations, acute onset and fluctuating level of consciousness, indicating other underlying factors, including medical illnesses. Excluding medical illnesses associated with psychosis is performed by using blood tests to measure:
 Thyroid-stimulating hormone to exclude hypo- or hyperthyroidism,
 Basic electrolytes and serum calcium to rule out a metabolic disturbance,
 Full blood count including ESR to rule out a systemic infection or chronic disease, and
 Serology to exclude syphilis or HIV infection.

Other investigations include:
 EEG to exclude epilepsy, and an
 MRI or CT scan of the head to exclude brain lesions.

Because psychosis may be precipitated or exacerbated by common classes of medications, medication-induced psychosis should be ruled out, particularly for first-episode psychosis. Both substance- and medication-induced psychosis can be excluded to a high level of certainty, using toxicology screening.

Because some dietary supplements may also induce psychosis or mania, but cannot be ruled out with laboratory tests, a psychotic individual's family, partner, or friends should be asked whether the patient is currently taking any dietary supplements.

Common mistakes made when diagnosing people who are psychotic include:

 Not properly excluding delirium,
 Not appreciating medical abnormalities (e.g., vital signs),
 Not obtaining a medical history and family history,
 Indiscriminate screening without an organizing framework,
 Missing a toxic psychosis by not screening for substances and medications,
 Not asking their family or others about dietary supplements,
 Premature diagnostic closure, and
 Not revisiting or questioning the initial diagnostic impression of primary psychiatric disorder.

Only after relevant and known causes of psychosis are excluded, a mental health clinician may make a psychiatric differential diagnosis using a person's family history, incorporating information from the person with psychosis, and information from family, friends, or significant others.

Types of psychosis in psychiatric disorders may be established by formal rating scales. The Brief Psychiatric Rating Scale (BPRS) assesses the level of 18 symptom constructs of psychosis such as hostility, suspicion, hallucination, and grandiosity. It is based on the clinician's interview with the patient and observations of the patient's behavior over the previous 2–3 days. The patient's family can also answer questions on the behavior report. During the initial assessment and the follow-up, both positive and negative symptoms of psychosis can be assessed using the 30 item Positive and Negative Symptom Scale (PANSS).

The DSM-5 characterizes disorders as psychotic or on the schizophrenia spectrum if they involve hallucinations, delusions, disorganized thinking, grossly disorganized motor behavior, or negative symptoms. The DSM-5 does not include psychosis as a definition in the glossary, although it defines "psychotic features", as well as "psychoticism" with respect to personality disorder. The ICD-10 has no specific definition of psychosis.

Factor analysis of symptoms generally regarded as psychosis frequently yields a five factor solution, albeit five factors that are distinct from the five domains defined by the DSM-5 to encompass psychotic or schizophrenia spectrum disorders. The five factors are frequently labeled as hallucinations, delusions, disorganization, excitement, and emotional distress. The DSM-5 emphasizes a psychotic spectrum, wherein the low end is characterized by schizoid personality disorder, and the high end is characterized by schizophrenia.

Prevention
The evidence for the effectiveness of early interventions to prevent psychosis appeared inconclusive. But psychosis caused by drugs can be prevented. Whilst early intervention in those with a psychotic episode might improve short-term outcomes, little benefit was seen from these measures after five years. However, there is evidence that cognitive behavioral therapy (CBT) may reduce the risk of  becoming psychotic in those at high risk, and in 2014 the UK National Institute for Health and Care Excellence (NICE) recommended preventive CBT for people at risk of psychosis.

Treatment
The treatment of psychosis depends on the specific diagnosis (such as schizophrenia, bipolar disorder or substance intoxication). The first-line treatment for many psychotic disorders is antipsychotic medication,
 which can reduce the positive symptoms of psychosis in about 7 to 14 days. For youth or adolescents, treatment options include medications, psychological interventions, and social interventions.

Medication
The choice of which antipsychotic to use is based on benefits, risks, and costs. It is debatable whether, as a class, typical or atypical antipsychotics are better. Tentative evidence supports that amisulpride, olanzapine, risperidone and clozapine may be more effective for positive symptoms but result in more side effects. Typical antipsychotics have equal drop-out and symptom relapse rates to atypicals when used at low to moderate dosages. There is a good response in 40–50%, a partial response in 30–40%, and treatment resistance (failure of symptoms to respond satisfactorily after six weeks to two or three different antipsychotics) in 20% of people. Clozapine is an effective treatment for those who respond poorly to other drugs ("treatment-resistant" or "refractory" schizophrenia), but it has the potentially serious side effect of agranulocytosis (lowered white blood cell count) in less than 4% of people.

Most people on antipsychotics get side effects. People on typical antipsychotics tend to have a higher rate of extrapyramidal side effects while some atypicals are associated with considerable weight gain, diabetes and risk of metabolic syndrome; this is most pronounced with olanzapine, while risperidone and quetiapine are also associated with weight gain. Risperidone has a similar rate of extrapyramidal symptoms to haloperidol.

Psychotherapy
Psychological treatments such as acceptance and commitment therapy (ACT) are possibly useful in the treatment of psychosis, helping people to focus more on what they can do in terms of valued life directions despite challenging symptomology. Metacognitive training (MCT) is associated with reduced delusions, hallucinations and negative symptoms as well as improved self-esteem and functioning in individuals with schizophrenia spectrum disorders.

There are many psychosocial interventions that seek to treat the symptoms of psychosis:  need adapted treatment, Open Dialogue, psychoanalysis/psychodynamic psychotherapy, major role therapy, soteria, psychosocial outpatient and inpatient treatment, milieu therapy, and  cognitive behavioral therapy (CBT). When these are used without antipsychotic medications, they may be somewhat effective for some people, especially for CBT, need-adapted treatment, and soteria.

Early intervention

Early intervention in psychosis is based on the observation that identifying and treating someone in the early stages of a psychosis can improve their longer term outcome. This approach advocates the use of an intensive multi-disciplinary approach during what is known as the critical period, where intervention is the most effective, and prevents the long-term morbidity associated with chronic psychotic illness.

Systematic reform 
Addressing systematic reform is essential to creating effective prevention as well as supporting treatments and recovery for those with psychosis.

Waghorn et al. suggest that education interventions can be a building block to support those with psychosis to successfully participate in society. In their study they analyse the relationship between successful education attainment and psychosis. Findings suggest proportionately more school aged persons with psychosis discontinued their education, compared to those without psychosis.

Waghorn et al. finds that specialised supported education for those with psychotic disorders can help lead to successful education attainment. Additionally, future employment outcomes are relative to such education attainment. Established approaches to supported education in the US include three basic models, self-contained classrooms, onsite support model and the mobile support model. Each model includes the participation of mental health service staff or educational facility staff in the student's education arrangements.

Potential benefits of specialised supported education found from this study include coordination with other service providers (e.g. income support, housing, etc.) to prevent disrupting education, providing specialised career counselling, development of coping skills in the academic environment. These examples provide beneficial ways for people with psychosis to finish studies successfully as well as counter future experiences of psychosis.

Research 
Further research in the form of randomized controlled trials is needed to determine the effectiveness of treatment approaches for helping adolescents with psychosis. Through 10 randomized clinical trials, studies showed that Early Intervention Services (EIS) for patients with early-phase schizophrenia spectrum disorders have generated promising outcomes. EIS are specifically intended to fulfill the needs of patients with early-phase psychosis. In addition, one meta-analysis that consisted of four randomized clinical trials has examined and discovered the efficacy of EIS to Therapy as Usual (TAU) for early-phase psychosis, revealing that EIS techniques are superior to TAU.

A study suggests that combining cognitive behavioral therapy (CBT) with SlowMo, an app that helps notice their "unhelpful quick-thinking", might be more effective for treating paranoia in people with psychosis than CBT alone.

References

Bibliography

Further reading 

 
 
 
 

Personal accounts

  [Semi-autobiographical]

External links 

National Institute of Mental Health

 
1840s neologisms
Wikipedia medicine articles ready to translate